The 2015 Chinese Women's Super League was the league's first season in its current incarnation, and the 19th total season of the women's association football league in China.

Results 

Hebei Yuandong were relegated to lower-division CWFL.

References 

2015
2014–15 domestic women's association football leagues
2015–16 domestic women's association football leagues
+